First Dynasty may refer to:
 The First Dynasty of Egypt (c. 3500–2900 BC)
 The First Dynasty of Kish (c. 3000–2600 BC)
 The First Dynasty of Uruk (c. 2700–2500 BC)
 The First Dynasty of Ur (c. 2600–2500 BC)
 The First Dynasty of Lagash (c. 2500–2300 BC)
 The First Babylonian dynasty (c. 1830 BC–c. 1531 BC)